The 1984 European Parliament election in Italy was held on 17 June 1984.

The election took place just a week after the death of Communist leader Enrico Berlinguer: this fact greatly influenced the vote, producing a historical result.

Electoral system
The pure party-list proportional representation was the traditional electoral system of the Italian Republic since its foundation in 1946, so it had been adopted to elect the Italian representatives to the European Parliament too. Two levels were used: a national level to divide seats between parties, and a constituency level to distribute them between candidates. Italian regions were united in 5 constituencies, each electing a group of deputies. At national level, seats were divided between party lists using the largest remainder method with Hare quota. All seats gained by each party were automatically distributed to their local open lists and their most voted candidates.

Results
The public emotion caused by Berlinguer's tragic death resulted in an extraordinary strength for the PCI: for the first time in Western Europe since the French election of 1956, and for the first time ever in Italian history, a Communist party received a plurality by a democratic vote.

However, in opposition, this result reinforced the moderate government ruling the country: the Socialist Party of Prime Minister Bettino Craxi had maintained its vote, and its major ally, the defeated Christian Democracy, did not want to take any chances of a political crisis that could lead to dangerous general election.

See also
1984 European Parliament election in Sardinia

External links
 Italian Minister of Interior

Italy
European Parliament elections in Italy
European Parliament